Gottlieb Perren (14 April 1926 – 10 May 2014) was a Swiss skier. He competed at the 1948 Winter Olympics and the 1952 Winter Olympics.

References

External links
 

1926 births
2014 deaths
Swiss male alpine skiers
Swiss male cross-country skiers
Swiss male Nordic combined skiers
Olympic alpine skiers of Switzerland
Olympic cross-country skiers of Switzerland
Olympic Nordic combined skiers of Switzerland
Alpine skiers at the 1952 Winter Olympics
Cross-country skiers at the 1948 Winter Olympics
Nordic combined skiers at the 1948 Winter Olympics
People from Zermatt
Sportspeople from Valais
20th-century Swiss people